Scarites buparius  is a species of beetles belonging to the family Carabidae.

Distribution
This species occurs in France, Greece, Italy, Spain and in North Africa.

Habitat
Scarites buparius lives in the coastal dunes and sandy beaches.

Description
The basic black color of this glossy beetle is aposematic, highlighting clearly the body on the sandy substrate.

Elytra present thin and shallow striae, almost absent in larger specimen. Sexual dimorphism is not conspicuous, but males are usually slightly smaller than females and the mandibles of the males are longer and hooked. This species is apterous.

Biology
The males use their impressive mandibles to fight each other. This intra-male aggressive behaviour consist of a repeated series of fighting events, during which a dominance/submission status is established. The attack behaviour persistence is correlated with the body length. During the fights the males grab the head of the antagonists and rise them into the air. These fights sometimes end with the death of one of the contenders.

Adults can be found in Spring and Summer, but present peaks of activity in May. They are used to spend the hottest hours of the day in their underground galleries, that they dig in the sand of the dunes with their strong front legs. Usually in the evening these carnivores insest goes hunting. They present a large spectrum of preys, preferably other insects and gastropods, beheaded with the powerful jaws. Then they devour their prey at the bottom of their holes.

Gallery

References 

buparius
Scaritinae
Beetles described in 1771
Taxa named by Johann Reinhold Forster